Faristenia acerella is a moth in the family Gelechiidae. It is found in the Russian Far East and Korea.

The wingspan is 13.5-14.5 mm. The forewings are brownish grey with a dark fuscous scale tuft at one-third below the cell. There is also a large costal patch near the middle, a small one before the middle, as well as two to three small ones beyond it.

The larvae feed on Acer ginnala.

References

Faristenia
Moths described in 1991